Maksim Andreyevich Votinov (born 29 August 1988) is a Russian professional footballer. He plays for FC Murom.

External links
 Guardian Football
 

1988 births
Living people
Footballers from Saint Petersburg
Russian footballers
Russian expatriate footballers
Expatriate footballers in Finland
Myllykosken Pallo −47 players
FC Baltika Kaliningrad players
Russian Premier League players
FC Arsenal Tula players
FC Luch Vladivostok players
MFK Zemplín Michalovce players
Expatriate footballers in Slovakia
FC Tosno players
FC Sibir Novosibirsk players
FC Rotor Volgograd players
FC Tyumen players
FK Jelgava players
FC Dynamo Bryansk players
Expatriate footballers in Latvia
Association football forwards
Latvian Higher League players
Veikkausliiga players
FC Leningradets Leningrad Oblast players